Cemal Nadir (13 July 1902 – 27 February 1947) was a Turkish cartoonist. Güler is the surname he assumed after the Surname Law of 1934.

Biography
Cemal Nadir was born in Bursa, Ottoman Empire on 13 July 1902. His father Şevket was a calligraphist employed in courts. He completed the primary school in Bursa, and the junior high school in Bilecik. In 1923, he married Melahat (Güler). Cemal Nadir Güler died on 27 February 1947 due to bacteremia. He was buried at Zincirlikuyu Cemetery in Istanbul.

Career
After finishing high school, he began working as a sign painter in Bursa. He also created cartoons, and his first cartoon appeared in Diken (literally: "The Thorn") periodical. Although he moved to İstanbul and tried to be a full-time cartoonist, he could not make it and he returned to Bursa. The Alphabet reform of 1929 gave Cemal Nadir a second chance to show his talent. When Turkey adopted the Latin alphabet replacing the Ottoman Turkish alphabet in Arabic script, all sign boards were necessarily changed, and he worked hard to meet the demand. The same year, he moved once more to İstanbul to work for the daily Akşam. Later, he also drew for the newspaper Son Posta, as well as for the satirical magazines such as Akbaba. He also contributed to Yedigün. During this period, he published the satirical magazine Amcabey. During World War II, he drew anti-Nazism cartoons in the daily Cumhuriyet. In 1946, Republican People's Party ( CHP) invited him to run for a seat in the parliament. However, he refused the invitation, he said that with political affiliation he would not be able to create cartoons.

Cartoon characters
He created the following cartoon characters:
Amcabey 
Ak'la Kara ("Black and White")
Dede ile Torun ("The Grandpa and the Grandson")
Dalkavuk ("The Sycophant")
Yeni Zengin ("Nouveau riche")
Salamon

He used these conflicting characters to criticize the social problems of that time in the country.

Comic books
His comic book are the following:
1932: Amcabey'e göre 
1933: Karikatür Albümü 
1939. Karikatür Albümü
1940: Akla Kara 
1943: Dalkavuk 
1944: Seçme Karikatürler
1945: Harp Zenginleri  
1946: Siyasi karikatürler 
1946: Amcabey

Legacy
After his death, two streets, one in İstanbul and one in Bursa, were named after him. A sculpture of him is erected in Bursa. 2002, which was his 100th anniversary of his birth, was declared as The Year of Cemal Nadir Güler by the "Cartoonists Association", and an annual international  cartoon contest was established bearing his name.

References

External links

  Lambiek Comiclopedia.

1902 births
People from Bursa
Turkish journalists
Turkish cartoonists
Turkish comics artists
Akşam people
Cumhuriyet people
1947 deaths
Burials at Zincirlikuyu Cemetery
20th-century journalists